Upsilon Aquilae, Latinized from υ Aquilae, is the Bayer designation for a star in the equatorial constellation of Aquila. With an apparent visual magnitude of +5.91 it is a faint star but visible to the naked eye from suburban skies. The star is drifting closer with a radial velocity of –30 km/s.

Upsilon Aquilae is a subgiant star with a stellar classification of A3 IV. The outer atmosphere is radiating energy into space with 10.5 times the Sun's luminosity from its photosphere at an effective temperature of 7,906 K, which gives it the white-hot glow of an A-type star. It is 180 million years old with 1.8 times the mass of the Sun and is spinning relatively quickly with a projected rotational velocity of 42 km/s.

References

External links
 HR 7519
 Image Upsilon Aquilae

A-type subgiants
Aquila (constellation)
Aquilae, Upsilon
BD+07 4210
Aquilae, 49
186689
097229
7519